Crum Elbow Meeting House and Cemetery is a historic Society of Friends meeting house and cemetery in East Park, Dutchess County, New York.  It was built in 1797, with an addition built about 1810. It is a two-story, white painted frame building with weather board siding and a moderately pitched gable roof. The surrounding rural cemetery contains plain Quaker style markers dated from about 1797 to 1890.

It was listed on the National Register of Historic Places in 1989.

References

External links
 

Churches on the National Register of Historic Places in New York (state)
Churches completed in 1797
18th-century Quaker meeting houses
Cemeteries on the National Register of Historic Places in New York (state)
Churches in Dutchess County, New York
Quaker cemeteries
Quaker meeting houses in New York (state)
Cemeteries in Dutchess County, New York
National Register of Historic Places in Dutchess County, New York